HMS Boston was a 32-gun  fifth-rate frigate of the Royal Navy.  She was launched in 1762. She served during the American Revolutionary War and the French Revolutionary War, and was broken up in 1811.

Enfant de la Patrie was eight days out of Bordeaux but had not taken anything. The captain of the privateer was drunk, and so decided to resist, firing his guns, small arms, and running his vessel into Boston. His rashness resulted in five of his crew being killed, ten wounded, and he himself drowning.

Citations

References
 Robert Gardiner, The First Frigates, Conway Maritime Press, London 1992. .
 David Lyon, The Sailing Navy List, Conway Maritime Press, London 1993. .

External links
 

 

Fifth-rate frigates of the Royal Navy
1762 ships
Ships built on the River Thames